Hip hop is one of the most popular music styles in Bulgaria, especially among young people.

History 
The Bulgarian hip hop culture development and influence is divided into two main periods. "The First Wave" ran from the mid-1980s to mid-1990s. This period is known with its underground rap and quite unfamiliar breakdancing crews, few graffiti artists and almost no DJs. At that time some of the active rappers were: In 1986 a street rapper called Ivo-Trombona recorded the first official Bulgarian rap song "This is a fake love" recorded in the only private recording studio back then - Dilema Studio in Sofia. Ivo-Trombona (later on renamed as Mc Guinness) is considered the first Bulgarian Rapper and founder of the Bulgarian rap and hip hop culture. In 1991 an eclectic group of musicians, Dobo Rap Plamen Sound, recorded an experimental live rap album in the Black Sea city of Bourgas. Another follow ups at that time era were: Dynamic ( DJ Stancho and Peter ), Gumeni Glavi, Amnistea (some members participate in Dope Reach Squad), Avi MC, Teslata and Bulldogz.

"The Second Wave" from 1999 to nowadays was a big time success in comparison to the first one, mainly due to the arrival of R'n'B and hip hop sensation, Henry Orhan Sami Beggin, otherwise known as Big Talk to his fans. Other prominent artists from this time are Misho Shamara (now changed his name to Big Sha) with his Frontline Hustle label, DJ Stancho, Spens and Slim and their label Sniper Records. Those two labels were quite controversial in terms of "real hip-hop", sampling and mostly which is "the better one". This east-west conflict was mimicking the US hip-hop scene only for commercial reasons.

In 2020, Trap, also known as New wave era, became the most listened-to genre in Bulgaria with modern artists as V:RGO, MurdaBoyz, Lil PMI, MBT, 100 Kila and many others.

Culture 
There are two main trends in Bulgarian hip-hop: mainstream and underground. The first one set by Gumeni Glavi and their label R'n'b Records mirrored the American rap scene as depicted on MTV, complete with grillz, heavy jewelry, scantly clad women, Dirty South/East Coast/West Coast variations.

Notable acts of hip-hop positive development are the several clubs specialized in R'n'B and hip-hop music, established by Misho Shamara and his clothing line. On the other side - Sniper Records - the quite successful hip-hop magazine "Knockout", the "NGP" video shooting studio, and the several hip-hop events powered by Sniper Records such as the Cilvaringz and RZA concert in Bulgaria and the "No borders" Balkan festivals placed in Sofia. No doubt this was big progress for Bulgarian hip-hop.

Notable acts 
The most distinct commercial Bulgarian rappers to date are Misho Shamara, Consa, 100 Kila, and Upsurt.

In 2007, Misho Shamara changed his name to Big Sha, signed to Universal Records and created a new label - Frontline Hustle, which is also signed to Virginia Records/Universal Records.

In 2008, Big Sha released his fifth studio album - Hliab & Amfeti (Bread and Amphetamines), which has guest appearances from Drag-On and Crucial Conflict, Frontline Hustle labelmates. The album was a major success in Bulgaria.

Big Sha was featured on LiLana's song "Dime Piece" together with American rapper Snoop Dogg. The song and the video were released in Bulgaria on April 24, 2009. As announced, this collaboration was probably the most unexpected by the Bulgarian rap fans, but it was made possible by the producer of the song Ariel Rodriguez. Also, this is the first collaboration
between a Bulgarian rapper and an American worldwide known rap star.

There are also some Bulgarian mainstream hip-hop artists who collaborate with folk-stars (e.g. Ustata).

The hip-hop scene in Bulgaria consists of numerous performers, including Spens, XA, Wosh & Yoko, X-Team, FARS (Funatic Adventures of Rhyme Sapiens), E.C.C.C - East Coast Cash Crew, Horata na Izgreva DRS+ (Dope Reach Squad working alongside Nokaut since 2002) and even have a representative of the crunk/dirty south movement, in the face of Jentaro and his group Nad Zakona (also known as Above Da Law Clique or just Above Da Law). He is notoriously known not only for his raw lyrics and gimmicks to turn a pending club crowd into a riot, but also for his rough flows and deliveries, often bordering with screaming. On March 31-st, 2010, he alongside other popular Bulgarian hip-hop artists was a supporting act for Lil Jon at his concert in Zala "Universiada" in Sofia, Bulgaria. He is the founder and developer of the crunk style in Bulgaria since 2005, being the first ever to bring it to Europe. Udarnata Grupa (The Striking Team) is the most prominent underground formation in Bulgaria, with no media appearance, a few events in Plovdiv, but with own distinctive style of rapping which is appreciated form those who are familiar with what is to be called "real hip-hop".

Upsurt is also a famous hip-hop group, which has gone from underground to mainstream. Their first album, Bozdugan, was released in 1999 and was based on rude and vulgar rhymes as well as original pop references.

After 2010 the Bulgarian hip hop scene was flooded with new innovative artist including - F.O., Keranov, Qvkata DLG, Dim4ou, Jluch and many others, who became popular with uploading their songs online and later making videoclips for the songs. They became notorious mostly with their lyrics concerning the everyday lifestyle of the Bulgarian youth.

References